The barka indigobird (Vidua larvaticola) is a species of bird in the family Viduidae. It is found in Cameroon, Ethiopia, Gambia, Ghana, Guinea, Nigeria, Sudan, and South Sudan. It is also known as the baka indigobird but the spelling "barka" is more correct; the word is a greeting in the Hausa language.

References

barka indigobird
Birds of Sub-Saharan Africa
barka indigobird
Taxonomy articles created by Polbot